The McIvor River slider (Lerista ingrami)  is a species of skink found in Queensland in Australia.

References

Lerista
Reptiles described in 1991
Taxa named by Glen Milton Storr